Oscar Mantegari (20 October 1928 – 13 May 2008) was an Argentine footballer. He played in two matches for the Argentina national football team in 1957. He was also part of Argentina's squad for the 1957 South American Championship.

References

External links
 

1928 births
2008 deaths
Argentine footballers
Argentina international footballers
Place of birth missing
Association football defenders
Club Atlético Atlanta footballers
Club Atlético River Plate footballers
Club Atlético Platense footballers